Oleku may refer to:

 O Le Ku, a 1997 film directed by Tunde Kelani
 Oleku, a fashion style and trend
 Oleku, a song by Ice Prince